The Shrine of ʻAbdu'l-Bahá is the location in Israel wherein the remains of ʻAbdu'l-Bahá, one of the central figures of the Baháʼí Faith, will be interred. Since his death in 1921, ʻAbdu'l-Bahá's remains have been located beneath one of the rooms of the Shrine of the Báb in Haifa, Israel.

In Holy Land
On April 20, 2019, the Universal House of Justice announced that the time for the construction of a permanent Shrine of ʻAbdu'l-Bahá has come, and provided initial details:

...The Baháʼí world is being summoned to build the edifice which will forever embosom those sacred remains. It is to be constructed in the vicinity of the Riḍván Garden, on land consecrated by the footsteps of the Blessed Beauty [that is, Baháʼu'lláh]; the Shrine of ʻAbdu'l-Bahá will thus lie on the crescent traced between the Holy Shrines in ʻAkká and Haifa. Work on the architectural plans is advancing, and more information will be shared in the coming months."

On May 7, 2019, the Universal House of Justice announced Hossein Amanat as the architect of the new Shrine. On September 19, it released the design concept for the shrine and stated that the structure envisaged in the design seeks “to honor ʻAbdu'l-Bahá's unique position” and “to reflect at once His lofty station and His humility.”

On 8 April 2022, a major fire broke out at the construction site of the new shrine. The fire broke out when windblown sparks from welding on the dome ignited scaffolding and expanded polystyrene (EPS) forms being used to mold poured concrete. The Universal House of Justice said in a statement that no one has been injured and that the Riḍván Garden was not damaged. It described the fire as "a considerable setback for the project", but said that construction would resume "as expeditiously as possible".

On 14 April 2022, the Universal House of Justice informed more details about the construction of the Shrine, that "initial information suggests that the fire was the result of an unfortunate accident", and that "the project team has already taken steps to move the project forward". 

On 4 July 2022, more information was shared by the Universal House of Justice regarding the Shrine of ‘Abdu’l-Bahá, that the investigations on the result of the fire "has now concluded and confirmed that the fire was the result of an accident", and "Although the [Shrine] structures are fundamentally sound", "extensive testing has commenced" "to ensure that the project meets the highest standard of excellence".

While no specific conclusion date for the project has been set, this accident will cause a substantial delay in finishing the project.

Canadian house
The house of May Maxwell, in Montreal, Canada, is the only place associated with ʻAbdu'l-Bahá to be officially designated a shrine. ʻAbdu'l-Bahá stayed there during his visits to the West. In a June 1953 letter, Shoghi Effendi wrote that the house “should be viewed in the nature of a national Shrine, because of its association with the beloved Master, during His visit to Montreal.” The Maxwell residence is located at 1548 Pine Avenue West, Montreal.

Notes

References

External links
BWNS: Coverage of construction work
The Baháʼí Gardens - official Website
Design concept for the Shrine of ʻAbdu'l-Bahá - video archived at Ghostarchive.org on 30 April 2022

Bahá'í pilgrimages
Abdul-Baha
Tombs in Israel